Callientomon is a genus of proturans in the family Acerentomidae.

Species
 Callientomon chinensis Yin, 1980

References

Protura